"If You're Reading This" is a song performed by American country music artist Tim McGraw. The song was first performed at the Academy of Country Music (ACM) awards, which were held in Las Vegas, Nevada and aired May 15, 2007 on CBS. Shortly after McGraw's live performance, several radio stations began playing a telecast of the song, boosting it to a debut at number 35 on the Billboard Hot Country Songs charts from unsolicited airplay. A remixed version of the live recording was later released to radio as a single, overlapping Tim's then-current single, "I Need You", a duet with wife Faith Hill.

In October 2007, "If You're Reading This" reached a peak of number 3 on the Billboard country charts, becoming McGraw's forty-second Top Ten country hit overall. The song also peaked at number 41 on the Billboard Hot 100.

About the song
"If You're Reading This" is a tribute to the families of soldiers who have died. Its lyrics take the form of a letter written from a soldier to his family — a letter that is intended to be sent only if the soldier dies ("If you're reading this / I'm already home").

McGraw co-wrote the song, with Brad and Brett Warren of country duo The Warren Brothers, approximately three weeks before the ACM awards aired. The three were inspired by reading a magazine article on war casualties.

When McGraw performed the song at the ACM awards show, one hundred relatives of soldiers joined him onstage, under a banner that read "Families of Fallen Heroes". After performing the song, he received a standing ovation.

Chart performance
Despite the lack of a studio recording, the song received airplay on country radio after several stations began playing the CBS telecast of McGraw's live performance. As a result, it entered Billboard'''s Hot Country Songs chart at number 35. Scott Siman, McGraw's manager, had been working with both the label (Curb Records) and radio stations to "address the fact that we don't have a studio recorded version of this song". A remixed version (with most of the audience noise removed, except for applause at the end) was released to radio in June 2007, while McGraw's then-current single "I Need You" (a Faith Hill duet) was also climbing the charts. This remix was added to later presses of his then current album Let It Go'', and Curb began promoting the song as a single in place of "I Need You".

"If You're Reading This" is the second song in McGraw's career that has charted from a live performance. In 2001, "unknown fans" taped McGraw's performance of the song "Things Change" during the CMA awards, and posted the recording to Napster; as a result, several stations downloaded and played the live telecast of that song.

Chart positions

Year-end charts

Certifications

References

2007 singles
2007 songs
Tim McGraw songs
Songs written by Tim McGraw
Songs written by the Warren Brothers
Song recordings produced by Byron Gallimore
Song recordings produced by Tim McGraw
Curb Records singles
Country ballads